"Youth" is the debut solo single by English singer and songwriter Foxes. The song was released as a digital download in Ireland on 6 September 2013 and in the United Kingdom on 27 October 2013 as the lead single from her debut studio album Glorious (2014). The song has peaked at number 21 on the Irish Singles Chart. The song was originally out in 2011, alongside a remix by Adventure Club, but did not get an official release until two years later. When the song was released digitally, it topped the UK iTunes charts.

Music video
A music video to accompany the release of "Youth" was first released onto YouTube on 12 August 2013 at a total length of three minutes and thirty-two seconds. The video starts with her in an office, before she breaks free from the grey work environment after a fire burns a hole in the wall. The version of "Youth" used in the music video is 49 seconds shorter than the album version. A radio edit of this song also exists, which is the same as the video version, but with a different and longer ending.

Critical reception
Robert Copsey of Digital Spy gave the song a very positive review stating:

"It was the first song where I thought, 'OK, now I can see the vision, now I can see the album'," Foxes recently said of her new single 'Youth'. We say new, but for the singer – real name Louisa Rose Allen – and serious pop fans, the song's journey from its birth to major label release has been a slow and often painful one, after she delayed its release and spent the intervening months guesting on songs for Rudimental and Zedd. Fortunately, 'Youth' still sounds as fresh and exciting as it did some 18 months after its premiere. "Don't tell me our youth is running out, it's only just begun" she sings over galloping beats and mournful electro throbs that build to a glorious strobing finale that acts as a fitting end to the summer months. Its trajectory may well have been slow and steady, but it looks like Foxes is still on course to win the race.

Track listing

Chart performance

Weekly charts

Certifications

Release history

See also
 List of Billboard Dance Club Songs number ones of 2013

References

2013 debut singles
Foxes (singer) songs
2011 songs
Songs written by Foxes (singer)